Neundorf (bei Schleiz) is a municipality in the district of Saale-Orla, Thuringia, Germany.

References

Saale-Orla-Kreis